James Shortle is an American economist, currently Distinguished Professor at Pennsylvania State University.

Bibliography

References

External links

(James S. Shortle)

Year of birth missing (living people)
Living people
Pennsylvania State University faculty
American economists
Iowa State University alumni